Claudine Lepage (born 10 August 1949) is a member of the Senate of France, representing the constituency of French citizens living abroad.  She is a member of the Socialist Party.

References
Page on the Senate website

1949 births
Living people
Socialist Party (France) politicians
French Senators of the Fifth Republic
Knights of the Ordre national du Mérite
Women members of the Senate (France)
Senators of French citizens living abroad
Politicians from Paris
20th-century French women